The Red Line is a Bay Area Rapid Transit (BART) line in the San Francisco Bay Area that runs from Richmond station to San Francisco International Airport station via Millbrae station. It has 24 stations in Richmond, El Cerrito, Berkeley, Oakland, San Francisco, Daly City, Colma, South San Francisco, San Bruno, and Millbrae. The line shares tracks with the five other mainline BART services.

As of February 14, 2022, the line runs until 9 pm every day.

Service history 
The Red Line was the fourth of BART's five primary rapid transit lines to open.

Citing increased ridership, BART extended weekday service on the line from 7pm to 8pm starting September 10, 2012. BART further extended service until 9pm on weekdays starting September 14, 2015.

SFO/Millbrae extension service 
San Mateo County is not a member of the San Francisco Bay Area Rapid Transit District, so SamTrans funded the county's BART service. When the extension's lower-than-expected ridership caused SamTrans to accrue deficits, BART agreed to SamTrans' request to operate only the Blue Line south of Daly City effective September 12, 2005.

SamTrans and BART reached an agreement in February 2007 in which SamTrans would transfer control and financial responsibility of the SFO/Millbrae extension to BART, in return for BART receiving additional fixed funding from SamTrans and other sources.

Beginning March 22, 2021, Red Line trains were interlined with the Purple Line, while Saturday service was discontinued. On August 2, 2021, the Red Line began operating on weekdays and Saturdays until 9 pm, with all trains extended to SFO. On February 20, 2022, the line began operating on all days until 9 pm. On some Sundays between February 20 and September 12, 2022, when power cable replacement work took place in San Francisco, the Yellow Line ran to Millbrae all day to replace the Red Line.

On March 6, 2022, a break in a power cable near Berkeley caused Red Line service to be temporarily discontinued. On March 8, a shuttle service began operating between SFO and Millbrae. Red Line service resumed with 5-car trains on March 22. Normal 10-car trains resumed service in early May. A similar cable break near Richmond on June 17, 2022, resulting in two days of cancelled Red Line service. Limited Red Line service resumed on June 20, with Orange Line service reduced and supplemental SFO–Millbrae shuttle service added.

Stations

References

External links 

 Richmond – Daly City/Millbrae Schedule

Red Line (BART)
Railway lines opened in 1976
1976 establishments in California